Qingliang Wenyi,  also known as Fayan Wenyi is a Chinese Buddhist monk in the early 10th century. Wenyi was born in Yuhang.  His secular surname is Lu. Fayan school, one of the main philosophical schools of Zen Buddhism was created by him.

Life 
Wenyi became a Buddhist monk by the age of 7. His first tutor was Quanwei Chanbo. He followed monk Xijue to the Ashoka temple of Mingzhou where Xijue and Wenyi preached. He then traveled to the southern city of Fuzhou in search of the solution of his doubts on the subject of Zen. In Fuzhou, Wenyi's knowledge gained him much popularity. However, he was not content with himself and thought that he had not detached himself from the secular world. His departure from Fuzhou eventually led him to Linchuan. The tradition of Zen Buddhism holds that it was during this particular trip, Wenyi acquired great insight(頓悟). Knowing that Wenyi is an accomplished Zen philosopher, the king of Nan Tang which ruled over the Linchuan region appointed a temple under his guidance. He would remain in the kingdom of Nan Tang for the rest of his life, promulgating the way of Zen. Wenyi died in the year 958. The King of Nan Tang ordered his royal subjects to wear white clothes for the mourning of Wenyi's death. A pagoda was built in Danyang in honor of Wenyi's spiritual accomplishments. His posthumous title "Zen master Dafayan"(大法眼禪師) was then granted.

Legacy 

Wenyi is sometimes referred as Fayan Wenyi for his status as the founder of Fayan school of Zen. The Fayan school was listed as one of the five major schools of Zen Buddhism. Some of his pupils such as Tiantai Deshao, the patriarch of the Kingdom of Wuyue, Wensui, the Patriarch of Jiangnan, and Huiju, Patriarch of Korea made major contributions to the promotion of Zen Buddhism in different regions of China and Korea.

References 

Zen patriarchs
Chinese scholars of Buddhism
Chan patriarchs
958 deaths
Year of birth unknown